The Diocese of Colorado is the diocese of the Episcopal Church which covers all of Colorado. It is in Province VI. Its cathedral, Saint John's Cathedral, Denver, is located in Denver, along with its offices. John Franklin Spalding was the first bishop of the diocese. Kimberly "Kym" Lucas is the current bishop.

History
Colorado was part of the Missionary District of the Northwest from 1859 until 1865, when the Missionary District of Colorado and Parts Adjacent was established. On October 4, 1866, the House of Bishops changed the Missionary District of Colorado and Parts Adjacent to include Colorado, New Mexico, and Wyoming, while Montana and Idaho were detached from Colorado. On October 30, 1874, the district was once more changed, this time as the Missionary District of Colorado with jurisdiction in Wyoming, while New Mexico was detached from Colorado. It was on October 15, 1883, that the Missionary District of Colorado was established, after which Wyoming was made a created into a separate missionary district. The Missionary District became the Diocese of Colorado on June 9, 1887.

Congregations by region 
The Episcopal Church in Colorado is divided into five regions – the Northwestern, Southwestern, Sangre de Cristo, High Plains, and Front Range:

Front Range 
 All Saints' Episcopal Church, Loveland, Colorado
 Calvary Episcopal Church, Golden, Colorado
 Church of the Holy Comforter, Broomfield, Colorado
 Church of the Transfiguration, Evergreen, Colorado
 Grace Episcopal Church, Georgetown, Colorado
 Our Merciful Savior Episcopal Church, Denver, Colorado
 Parish Church of St. Bartholomew the Apostle, Estes Park, Colorado
 St. Aidan's Episcopal Church, Boulder, Colorado
 St. Alban's Episcopal Church, Windsor, Colorado
 St. Ambrose Episcopal Church, Boulder, Colorado
 St. Brigit Episcopal Church, Frederick, Colorado
 St. James Episcopal Church, Wheat Ridge, Colorado
 St. John Chrysostom Episcopal Church, Golden, Colorado
 St. John's Episcopal Church, Boulder, Colorado
 St. Joseph Episcopal Church, Lakewood, Colorado
 St. Laurence's Episcopal Church, Conifer, Colorado
 St. Luke Episcopal Church, Fort Collins, Colorado
 St. Martha's Episcopal Church, Westminster, Colorado
 St. Mary Magdalene Episcopal Church, Boulder, Colorado
 St. Paul Episcopal Church, Central City, Colorado
 St. Paul's Episcopal Church, Fort Collins, Colorado
 St. Paul's Episcopal Church, Lakewood, Colorado
 St. Philip & St. James Episcopal Church, Denver, Colorado
 St. Stephen's Episcopal Church, Longmont, Colorado
 The Church of Christ the King, Arvada, Colorado
 The Episcopal Parish of St. Gregory, Littleton, Colorado
 Trinity Episcopal Church, Greeley, Colorado

High Plains 
 Christ Episcopal Church, Denver, Colorado
 Christ's Episcopal Church, Castle Rock, Colorado
 Church of the Ascension, Denver, Colorado
 Epiphany Episcopal Church, Denver, Colorado
 Good Shepherd Episcopal Church, Centennial, Colorado
 Intercession Episcopal Church, Thornton, Colorado
 Peace in Christ ELM, Elizabeth, Colorado
 Prince of Peace Episcopal Church, Sterling, Colorado
 St. Andrew's Episcopal Church, Denver, Colorado
 St. Andrew's Episcopal Church, Fort Lupton, Colorado
 St. Barnabas Episcopal Church, Denver, Colorado
 St. Bede Episcopal Chapel, Denver, Colorado
 St. Charles the Martyr Episcopal Church, Ft. Morgan, Colorado
 St. Elizabeth's Episcopal Church, Brighton, Colorado
 St. Francis Episcopal Chapel, Denver, Colorado
 St. Gabriel the Archangel Episcopal Church, Cherry Hills Village, Colorado
 St. John's Cathedral, Denver, Colorado
 St. Luke's Episcopal Church, Denver, Colorado
 St. Martin-in-the-Fields Episcopal Church, Aurora, Colorado
 St. Matthew's Episcopal Church, Parker, Colorado
 St. Michael & All Angels Episcopal Church, Denver, Colorado
 St. Philip-in-the-Field Episcopal Church, Sedalia, Colorado
 St. Stephen's Episcopal Church, Aurora, Colorado
 St. Thomas Episcopal Church, Denver, Colorado
 St. Timothy's Episcopal Church, Centennial, Colorado
 Sudanese Community Church, Denver, Colorado
 The Church of the Holy Redeemer, Denver, Colorado
 The Episcopal Church of St. Peter and St. Mary, Denver, Colorado

Northwestern 
 All Saints Episcopal Church, Battlement Mesa, Colorado
 Christ Episcopal Church, Aspen, Colorado
 Cranmer Memorial Chapel, Winter Park, Colorado
 Episcopal Church of the Transfiguration, Vail, Colorado
 Grace Episcopal Church, Buena Vista, Colorado
 St. Barnabas Episcopal Church, Glenwood Springs, Colorado
 St. George Episcopal Church, Leadville, Colorado
 St. James' Episcopal Church, Meeker, Colorado
 St. John Episcopal Church, New Castle, Colorado
 St. John the Baptist Episcopal Church, Breckenridge, Colorado
 St. John the Baptist Episcopal Church, Granby, Colorado
 St. Mark's Episcopal Church, Craig, Colorado
 St. Paul Episcopal Church, Steamboat Springs, Colorado
 St. Peter Episcopal Church, Basalt, Colorado
 St. Timothy's Episcopal Church, Rangely, Colorado
 Trinity Episcopal Church, Kremmling, Colorado

Sangre de Cristo 
 Chapel of Our Saviour, Colorado Springs, Colorado
 Chapel of the Resurrection, Limon, Colorado
 Christ Episcopal Church, Canon City, Colorado
 Church of St. Michael the Archangel, Colorado Springs, Colorado
 Church of the Ascension & Holy Trinity, Pueblo, Colorado
 Church of the Ascension, Salida, Colorado
 Little Shepard of the Hills Mission, Crestone, Colorado
 Church of the Good Shepherd, Colorado Springs, Colorado
 Grace & St. Stephen's Episcopal Church, Colorado Springs, Colorado 
 St. Andrew Episcopal Church, La Junta, Colorado
 St. Andrew's Episcopal Church, Cripple Creek, Colorado
 St. Andrew's Episcopal Church, Manitou Springs, Colorado
 St. Benedict Episcopal Church, La Veta, Colorado
 St. David of the Hills Episcopal Church, Woodland Park, Colorado
 St. Luke's Episcopal Mission, Westcliffe, Colorado
 St. Matthias Episcopal Church, Monument, Colorado
 St. Paul's Episcopal Church, Lamar, Colorado
 St. Peter the Apostle Episcopal Church, Pueblo, Colorado
 St. Raphael Episcopal Church, Colorado Springs, Colorado

Southwestern 
 All Saints in the Mountains, Crested Butte, Colorado
 Church of the Good Samaritan, Gunnison, Colorado
 Little Shepherd of the Hills Episcopal Chapel, Crestone, Colorado
 St. Augustine's Episcopal Chapel, Creede, Colorado
 St. Barnabas of the Valley, Cortez, Colorado
 St. Francis of Assisi, South Fork, Colorado
 St. James Episcopal Church, Lake City, Colorado
 St. John Episcopal Church, Ouray, Colorado
 St. Luke's Episcopal Church, Delta, Colorado
 St. Mark's Episcopal Church, Durango, Colorado
 St. Matthew Episcopal Church, Grand Junction, Colorado
 St. Patrick Episcopal Church, Pagosa Springs, Colorado
 St. Paul Episcopal Church, Montrose, Colorado
 St. Paul's Church, Mancos, Colorado
 St. Stephen the Martyr, Monte Vista, Colorado
 St. Thomas the Apostle, Alamosa, Colorado
 The Church of the Nativity, Grand Junction, Colorado

List of bishops

References

External links 
 
 Journal of the Annual Council of the Diocese of Colorado

Episcopal Church in Colorado
Province 6 of the Episcopal Church (United States)